Philanthus pulchellus is a species of bee-hunting wasp (or "beewolf") of the Iberian Peninsula  (Spain, Portugal, and France). Males are territorial and establish territories in nesting areas of females, or in the case of smaller males that are unable to do so, nearby. Females are generalist predators of bees and wasps, including conspecifics, and store the prey in their underground nest.

References

Crabronidae
Hymenoptera of Europe
Insects described in 1842
Taxa named by Maximilian Spinola